Kaeo Weekes (born 6 February 2002) is an Australian professional rugby league footballer who plays as a  for the Manly Warringah Sea Eagles in the NRL.

Background
A former athletics sprint champion from Newington College, Weekes made a big impression in his first season in the Harold Matthews Cup in 2017, scoring 11 tries despite playing up an age group.

Weekes attended the Sea Eagles Pathways Academy and was a prolific try scorer in the SG Ball and Harold Matthews competitions after joining Manly at 14 years of age. He joined the development squad at Manly in 2021.

Playing career

2022
Weekes made his NRL debut in round 19 of the 2022 NRL season against the St. George Illawarra Dragons playing 13 minutes off the bench.

References

External links
Manly Warringah Sea Eagles profile

2002 births
Living people
Australian rugby league players
Manly Warringah Sea Eagles players
Rugby league five-eighths
Rugby league fullbacks
Rugby league players from Sydney